Mikhail Youzhny was the defending champion but lost in the semifinals to top-seeded Marin Čilić.
Čilić went on to win the title by defeating Jürgen Melzer 6–3, 6–1 in the final.

Seeds

Draw

Finals

Top half

Bottom half

Qualifying

Seeds

Qualifiers

Lucky losers
  Dino Marcan
  Matteo Viola

Draw

First qualifier

Second qualifier

Third qualifier

Fourth qualifier

References
 Main Draw
 Qualifying Draw

PBZ Zagreb Indoors - Singles
2013 Singles
2013 PBZ Zagreb Indoors